Gohira Degree College is a private, pass-level degree college in Raozan Upazila, Chittagong District, Bangladesh. It was founded in 1968 by writer Mahbub Ul Alam Choudhury.

The campus is located on the south side of the Chittagong-Rangamati Highway in Gohira. The college sports ground was selected as the site for the construction of Sheikh Russell Mini Stadium in 2017. Another project underway is the construction of a BDT 12.1 million (US$150,000) four-story information technology building, as of 2017.

The college transitioned to an online admissions process in 2015.

References

Private colleges in Bangladesh
Colleges in Chittagong
Educational institutions established in 1968
1968 establishments in East Pakistan